Born in the early 1900s, Leona W. Chalmers is best known for inventing the first usable and available modern menstrual cup. She was also an actress and author who wrote the book The Intimate Side of a Woman’s Life.

Biography

Chalmers dedicated herself to designing and patenting the modern menstrual cup. Before Chalmers’ invention, other devices were designed that used a similar, cup-like device to collect menstrual fluid. The earliest apparatus had been a “Catamenial Sack” in 1867. The Catamenial Sack was a medieval contraption that included a belt with a cup attached (with wire) to be inserted into the vagina. Women would don this sac internally, holding it up with a belt and straps. While some earlier inventions used flexible sacs, some used metal cups and, paired with the belt, these alternatives were neither discrete nor comfortable to use. Thus, Chalmers patented the first ever reusable menstrual cup even though the sanitary pad reigned over the world of menstrual health. Chalmers’ invention was made of vulcanized rubber and was much more comfortable and discrete than the catamenial sacks. 

The cups did not do well in the market due to the mentality of the time and the availability of disposable solutions. According to Robert P. Oreck, the founder, and president of Tassette, Inc., a later menstrual cup company started in late 1959, this first cup started production just as World War 2 began, and got stalled because of the shortage of rubber. After the war, Chalmers continued her enterprise progressing menstrual cups but failed. She then later sold the rights of the design to Robert Oreck. Tassette still did not succeed in selling the new product to American women, mainly since they were used to the use of pads and other disposable options. Other reasons for the failure were the fact that it was hard to advertise a product related to a taboo subject, femininity, as well as the mindset regarding the insertion of the device into the vagina. It was incredibly hard for the company to gain traction, as marketing the product was virtually impossible. At the time, utilizing the words ‘vagina’ and ‘period’ was almost forbidden to use in advertisements. As a result, the company shut down in 1973.
After years out of the markets, the cups were relaunched at the beginning of the 21st century. Nowadays, menstrual cups are becoming more popular due to the growing awareness of environmental issues (one cup purchased saves 2800+ tampons from going to a landfill) and the availability of hypoallergenic medical silicone.

References

Date of birth missing
Place of birth missing
Women inventors
20th-century inventors
Nationality missing